Melason is a Philippine reality series that follows Pinoy Big Brother: Double Up contestants and real-life couple Melisa Cantiveros and Jason Francisco. It started broadcasting on ABS-CBN on February 22, 2010. It features behind the scenes footage after the PBB Big Night and few of guesting programs in all ABS-CBN shows.

It is considered as the first spin-off show of Pinoy Big Brother, and is advertised as the first "Reality Serye".

Overview

As part of the show's concept, Pinoy Big Brother: Double Up's Big Five housemates were told to stay in the House for a few more weeks. The series focuses on Cantiveros and Francisco, who entered into a relationship during Double Up. Over the course of the series, scripted or simulated situations would be presented to Francisco and Cantiveros.

Although the Big Five housemates are still inside the house, the Pinoy Big Brother rules were no longer put into effect. The housemates themselves would leave the house from time to time to appear in ABS-CBN's shows. The housemates are no longer in the house, as it has been used for the third Teen Edition.

Episodes
The first season focused on Cantiveros and Francisco's adventures in the first few weeks after Double Up. They are featured in actual or scripted situations designed to test their relationship.

Follow the adventures of a young couple from the province, Cantiveros and Francisco as they try their luck in the city to pursue their dreams for their families. This season is 4 episodes long.

Picking up where ...In Love left off, the third series show Cantiveros and Francisco as they try to adjust to life in Manila, seeing as they come from far-flung places (known as entitled ... In Da City and ...Promdi Heart).

Cast

Host
 Bianca Gonzalez

Main cast
Melisa "Melai" Cantiveros 
Jason Francisco

Special participation
Rica Paras
Paul Jake Castillo
Johan Santos
Tibo Jumalon
Ryan Sarzate

Theme song
The theme song used on the show is Cantiveros and Francisco's cover version of You are the One by Serenity (original version) & Toni Gonzaga & Sam Milby (in movie theme song).

See also
List of programs broadcast by ABS-CBN

References

External links
 Official Website

ABS-CBN original programming
Philippine reality television series
2010 Philippine television series debuts
2010 Philippine television series endings
Television spin-offs
Filipino-language television shows